This is a list of Canadian television-related events from 1984.

Events

Debuts

Ending this year

Births 
July 19 – Andrea Libman, Actress, voice actress and singer
September 22 – Laura Vandervoort, actress

Television shows

1950s
Country Canada (1954–2007)
The Friendly Giant (1958–1985)
Hockey Night in Canada (1952–present)
The National (1954–present)
Front Page Challenge (1957–1995)
Wayne and Shuster Show (1958–1989)

1960s
CTV National News (1961–present)
Land and Sea (1964–present)
Man Alive (1967–2000)
Mr. Dressup (1967–1996)
The Nature of Things (1960–present, scientific documentary series)
Question Period (1967–present, news program)
Reach for the Top (1961–1985)
The Tommy Hunter Show (1965–1992)
W-FIVE (1966–present, newsmagazine program)

1970s
The Beachcombers (1972–1990)
Canada AM (1972–present, news program)
City Lights (1973–1989)
Definition (1974–1989)
the fifth estate (1975–present, newsmagazine program)
The Littlest Hobo (1979–1985)
Live It Up! (1978–1990)
The Mad Dash (1978–1985)
Marketplace (1972–present, newsmagazine program)
Smith & Smith (1979–1985)
You Can't Do That on Television (1979–1990)
100 Huntley Street (1977–present, religious program)

1980s
Bizarre (1980–1985)
Bumper Stumpers (1987–1990)
Guess What (1983–1987)
The Edison Twins (1982–1986)
Fraggle Rock (1983–1987)
Hangin' In (1981–1987)
The Journal (1982–1992)
Lorne Greene's New Wilderness (1982–1987)
Seeing Things (1981–1987)
Snow Job (1983–1985)
Switchback (1981–1990)
Today's Special (1982–1987)
Thrill of a Lifetime (1981–1987)

TV movies
A Change of Heart
Chautauqua Girl
Hide & Seek
I Love a Man in Uniform
Kate Morris, Vice President
Rough Justice
Slim Obsession

Television stations

Debuts

References

See also
 1984 in Canada
 List of Canadian films of 1984